The 2023 Bahrain Darts Masters was the first staging of the tournament by the Professional Darts Corporation. It was the first event in the 2023 World Series of Darts. The tournament featured 16 players (8 PDC representatives and 8 Asian representatives), and was held at the Bahrain International Circuit in Sakhir, Bahrain on 12–13 January 2023.

Michael Smith won the inaugural staging of the event, and his third World Series title, defeating Gerwyn Price 8–6 in the final.

The event was announced on 26 September 2022, alongside the 2023 Nordic Darts Masters, which are to be held a week later.

Prize money
The total prize fund is expected to be at £60,000.

Qualifiers
The PDC announced 7 of their 8 players who are their elite representatives at the event on 13 December 2022, and did not include Michael van Gerwen, who couldn't attend for family reasons. Jonny Clayton was announced as the 8th representative on 4 January 2023.

As this was the first World Series event of the year, the PDC representatives were seeded based on their positions on the PDC Order of Merit following the 2023 PDC World Darts Championship.

  (champion)
  (quarter-finals)
  (runner-up)
  (quarter-finals)
  (semi-finals)
  (quarter-finals)
  (quarter-finals)
  (semi-finals)

The Asian representatives consisted of six invited players, alongside 2 Bahrain qualifiers that were decided in a qualifier held on 17–18 December 2022.

Draw
The draw was announced on 10 January 2023.

References

Bahrain Darts Masters
World Series of Darts
Sports competitions in Bahrain
Bahrain Darts Masters
Bahrain Darts Masters